The French Fencing Federation ( - FFE) is the national governing body for fencing in France. It is affiliated with the International Fencing Federation. The president is Bruno Gares, and the treasurer is Sylvie Sormail. The organisation was founded in 1906, and has its headquarters in Noisy-Le-Grand.

French fencers
 Philippe Boisse, épée, vice president of the French Fencing Federation
 Yves Dreyfus, épée, Olympic bronze, French champion
 Alexandre Lippmann, épée, 2x Olympic champion, 2x silver, bronze
 Armand Mouyal, épée, Olympic bronze, world champion
 Claude Netter, foil, Olympic champion, silver
 Eric Srecki, épée, Olympic and World champion
 Jean Stern, épée, Olympic champion
 Romain Cannone, épée, Olympic champion
 Anne-Lise Touya, sabre
 Damien Touya, sabre

References

National federations of the European Fencing Confederation
Fencing
Fencing organizations
Fencing in France
1906 establishments in France
Sports organizations established in 1906
Organizations based in Paris